Trichoglottis, commonly known as cherub orchids or 毛舌兰属 (mao she lan shu), is a genus of flowering plants in the family Orchidaceae. Orchids in this genus are epiphytic plants with thick roots, relatively thick, fibrous stems and many large, thick, leathery leaves arranged in two ranks. The flowers are usually small and yellowish with light brown or purple markings. The flowers have broad sepals, narrower petals and a labellum which has three lobes and is often hairy. There are about 85 species distributed from tropical and subtropical Asia to the north-western Pacific. Most species grow in rainforest.

Description
Orchids in the genus Trichoglottis are epiphytic or climbing herbs with a monopodial habit, thick roots and straggly or pendulous stems. There are many large, leathery linear to elliptic leaves arranged in two ranks with their bases sheathing the stems. From one to a few relatively small flowers are arranged on flowering stems arising from leaf axils. The flowers are resupinate and commonly yellowish with light brown or purple markings. They tend to be produced sporadically throughout the year and last for about a week. The sepals are free and subsimilar. The petals are also free from each other and slightly shorter than the sepals. The labellum is fixed rigidly to the column, fleshy, pubescent or hairy, formed by three lobes and features a sac or spur.

Taxonomy and naming
The genus Trichoglottis was first formally described in 1825 by Carl Ludwig Blume and the description was published in Bijdragen tot de flora van Nederlandsch Indië.

The name Trichoglottis means "hair tongue", and refers to the type species' pubescent labellum.

Ceratochilus
In 2014, Kocyan and Schuiteman moved the former monotypic genus Ceratochilus into Trichoglottis. The sole species of Ceratochilus, C. biglandulosus, is endemic to the island of Java in Indonesia. Though Ceratochilus was never considered to be closely related to Trichoglottis, molecular analysis strongly supported its position as sister to T. pusilla. Rather than excluding T. pusilla, the authors merged Ceratochilus with Trichoglottis.

Species list
The following is a list of species of Trichoglottis accepted by the World Checklist of Selected Plant Families as at January 9019:

 Trichoglottis acutifolia Ridl.
 Trichoglottis adnata J.J.Sm.
 Trichoglottis agusanensis Ames & Quisumb.
 Trichoglottis amesiana L.O.Williams
 Trichoglottis angusta J.J.Sm.
 Trichoglottis atropurpurea Rchb.f.
 Trichoglottis australiensis Dockrill
 Trichoglottis biglandulosa (Blume) Kocyan & Schuit.
 Trichoglottis bimae Rchb.f.
 Trichoglottis bipenicillata J.J.Sm.
 Trichoglottis bipunctata (C.S.P.Parish & Rchb.f.) Tang & F.T.Wang (1951).
 Trichoglottis borneensis (J.J.Wood) Kocyan & Schuit.
 Trichoglottis brachystachya (Kraenzl.) Garay
 Trichoglottis calcarata Ridl.
 Trichoglottis calochila L.O.Williams
 Trichoglottis canhii Aver.
 Trichoglottis celebica Rolfe
 Trichoglottis chrysochila (Kraenzl.) Ormerod & Cootes
 Trichoglottis collenetteae J.J.Wood, C.L.Chan & A.L.Lamb
 Trichoglottis crociaria Seidenf.
 Trichoglottis cuneilabris Carr
 Trichoglottis cypriana P.O'Byrne, Gokusing & J.J.Wood
 Trichoglottis dawsoniana (Rchb.f.) Rchb.f.
 Trichoglottis fasciata Rchb.f.
 Trichoglottis geminata (Teijsm. & Binn.) J.J.Sm.
 Trichoglottis gibbosicalcar (Seidenf.) Senghas in F.R.R.Schlechter
 Trichoglottis granulata Ridl.
 Trichoglottis guibertii (Linden & Rchb.f.) Rchb.f.
 Trichoglottis hastatiloba J.J.Wood & A.L.Lamb
 Trichoglottis ionosma (Lindl.) J.J.Sm.
 Trichoglottis javanica J.J.Sm.
 Trichoglottis jiewhoei J.J.Wood, A.L.Lamb & C.L.Chan
 Trichoglottis joiceyana J.J.Sm.
 Trichoglottis kinabaluensis Rolfe
 Trichoglottis koordersii Rolfe
 Trichoglottis lanceolaria Blume
 Trichoglottis lasioglossa (Schltr.) Ormerod
 Trichoglottis latisepala Ames
 Trichoglottis ledermannii Schltr.
 Trichoglottis littoralis Schltr.
 Trichoglottis lobifera J.J.Sm.
 Trichoglottis loheriana (Kraenzl.) L.O.Williams
 Trichoglottis lorata (Rolfe ex Downie) Schuit.
 Trichoglottis lowderiana Choltco
 Trichoglottis luchuensis (Rolfe) Garay & H.R.Sweet
 Trichoglottis luwuensis P.O'Byrne & J.J.Verm.
 Trichoglottis luzonensis Ames
 Trichoglottis maculata (J.J.Sm.) J.J.Sm.
 Trichoglottis magnicallosa Ames & C.Schweinf. in O.Ames
 Trichoglottis mimica L.O.Williams
 Trichoglottis mindanaensis Ames
 Trichoglottis odoratissima Garay
 Trichoglottis orchidea (J.Koenig) Garay
 Trichoglottis paniculata J.J.Sm.
 Trichoglottis pantherina J.J.Sm.
 Trichoglottis papuana Schltr.
 Trichoglottis pauciflora J.J.Sm.
 Trichoglottis persicina P.O'Byrne
 Trichoglottis philippinensis Lindl.
 Trichoglottis punctata Ridl.
 Trichoglottis pusilla (Teijsm. & Binn.) Rchb.f.
 Trichoglottis ramosa (Lindl.) Senghas in F.R.R.Schlechter
 Trichoglottis retusa Blume
 Trichoglottis rigida Blume
 Trichoglottis rosea (Lindl.) Ames in E.D.Merrill
 Trichoglottis scandens J.J.Sm.
 Trichoglottis scaphigera Ridl.
 Trichoglottis seidenfadenii Aver.
 Trichoglottis simplex J.J.Sm.
 Trichoglottis sitihasmahae J.J.Wood & A.L.Lamb
 Trichoglottis smithii Carr
 Trichoglottis sororia Schltr.
 Trichoglottis subviolacea (Llanos) Merr.
 Trichoglottis tamesisii Quisumb. & C.Schweinf.
 Trichoglottis tenera (Lindl.) Rchb.f.
 Trichoglottis tenuis Ames & C.Schweinf. in O.Ames
 Trichoglottis tinekeae Schuit.
 Trichoglottis tricostata J.J.Sm.
 Trichoglottis triflora (Guillaumin) Garay & Seidenf.
 Trichoglottis uexkuelliana J.J.Sm.
 Trichoglottis valida Ridl.
 Trichoglottis vandiflora J.J.Sm.
 Trichoglottis ventricularis Kocyan & Schuit.
 Trichoglottis winkleri J.J.Sm.
 Trichoglottis winkleri var. minor J.J.Sm.
 Trichoglottis winkleri var. winkleri
 Trichoglottis zollingeriana (Kraenzl.) J.J.Sm.

Distribution and habitat
Orchids in the genus Trichoglottis are found in China, Taiwan, Assam, Bangladesh, the Indian subcontinent, Sri Lanka, the Andaman Islands, Cambodia, Laos, Myanmar, the Nicobar Islands, Thailand, Vietnam, Borneo, Java, the Lesser Sunda Islands, Malaysia, the Maluku Islands, the Philippines, Sulawesi, Sumatra, the Bismarck Archipelago, New Guinea the Solomon Islands, Queensland (Australia), the Caroline Islands and Palau. Most species grow in rainforest.

Gallery

References

External links

Vandeae genera